Glyphipterix lunaris is a species of sedge moth in the genus Glyphipterix. It was described by Yutaka Arita and John B. Heppner in 1992. It is endemic to Taiwan.

References

Glyphipterigidae
Endemic fauna of Taiwan
Moths of Taiwan
Moths described in 1992